Carnethy Hill, the second highest of the Pentland Hills, is a hill 3 miles (5 km) north-west of Penicuik, Scotland.

It lends its name to the Carnethy 5 hill race held annually since 1971, and the Carnethy Hill Running Club. Loganlea Reservoir lies on the Northwest flank of the hill.

Etymology
Carnethy is probably etymologically a Cumbric name. The main suggestion in past scholarship is that it is cognate with Welsh carneddau, 'cairns'.

References

Mountains and hills of Midlothian
Hills of the Scottish Midland Valley